Party Malin is a political party in Mauritius. The party is currently led by Danrajsingh Aubeeluck.

History
Parti Malin was formed by veteran Aneerood Gujadhur in 1982.

References

Political parties in Mauritius
Political parties established in 2017